Olepa coromandelica is a moth of the family Erebidae. It was found in India in the 19th century on the Coromandel Coast. No modern specimens have been  collected later. Probably, it is extinct now.

References
 , 2011: A new Olepa Watson, 1980 species from South India (Lepidoptera, Arctiidae). Atalanta 42 (1/2): 136-137.

Spilosomina
Moths described in 2011